Alexander Thompson VC (1824 – 29 March 1880) was a Scottish recipient of the Victoria Cross, the highest and most prestigious award for gallantry in the face of the enemy that can be awarded to British and Commonwealth forces.

Details
Thompson was about 34 years old, and a lance-corporal in the 42nd Regiment of Foot (later The Black Watch (Royal Highlanders)), British Army during the Indian Mutiny when the following deed took place for which he was awarded the VC. On 15 April 1858 during the attack on Fort Ruhya, British India, Lance-Corporal Thompson volunteered, with others, including Edward Spence, to assist Captain William Martin Cafe in carrying in the body of a lieutenant from the top of the glacis, in an exposed position under heavy fire. His citation read:

Further information
Alexander joined the 42nd Regiment (later renamed the Black Watch) in 1842. He served in Malta, Bermuda and later the Crimea where he fought at the battles of Alma, Sevastepol and Balaclava. Following his service in India during the Indian Mutiny he was promoted to the rank of Sergeant. He retired from the army in 1862 and spent his remaining years in Perth until his death in 1880. He was survived by his wife Isabella and 4 children. 
He is buried in Wellshill Cemetery in north Perth.
Alexander's eldest son, George became a Church of Scotland minister in the parish of Carnbee Fife.

The medal
His Victoria Cross is displayed at the Black Watch Museum, Perth, Scotland.
Also displayed are his campaign medals – Crimea with Alma, Sebastopol and Balaclava clasps; Turkish medal, and Indian Mutiny with Lucknow clasp.

References

Monuments to Courage (David Harvey, 1999)
The Register of the Victoria Cross (This England, 1997)
Scotland's Forgotten Valour (Graham Ross, 1995)

External links
Location of grave and VC medal (Tayside)

1824 births
1880 deaths
Military personnel from Edinburgh
British recipients of the Victoria Cross
Black Watch soldiers
Indian Rebellion of 1857 recipients of the Victoria Cross
British Army personnel of the Crimean War
British Army recipients of the Victoria Cross